This is a list of films which have placed number one at the weekend box office in the Australia during 2010. All amounts are in Australian dollars.

Notes
A  A biennial event showcasing anime films for two weeks, held by Madman Entertainment in cinemas in capital cities across the country. The films are screened in their native Japanese with English subtitles. In 2010, the films were: Evangelion: 2.0 You Can (Not) Advance (with additional limited screenings of Evangelion: 1.0 You Are (Not) Alone), King of Thorn, Redline, and Summer Wars.

References
Urban Cinefile – Box Office

See also
List of Australian films – Australian films by year

2010
Australia
2010 in Australian cinema